Roy Greaves (born 4 April 1947) is an English former footballer who made more than 500 appearances in the Football League playing for Bolton Wanderers, where he spent the vast majority of his career, and Rochdale, and in the North American Soccer League for the Seattle Sounders.

Greaves was born in Farnworth, near Bolton. He began his football career as a junior with Bolton Wanderers, playing as a striker, and scored twice in his league debut against Southampton in 1965. With the team struggling after the abolishment of the maximum wage he still managed to lead the side's goal scoring charts but was criticised as the club went into the Third Division for the first time.

When Jimmy Armfield took over as manager in the summer of 1971 he withdrew Greaves into a midfield role. Playing in this role he helped the team win the Third Division Championship in 1972–73 and eventually back into the top flight in 1977–78. Bolton's relegation two seasons later brought an end to Greaves' time at the club and he moved initially to the United States to play for Seattle Sounders before seeing out his career with a season at Rochdale. He then moved back to Bolton to run a pub.

References

External links
 

1947 births
Living people
People from Farnworth
English footballers
Association football forwards
Bolton Wanderers F.C. players
Seattle Sounders (1974–1983) players
Rochdale A.F.C. players
English Football League players
North American Soccer League (1968–1984) players
North American Soccer League (1968–1984) indoor players
Association football midfielders
English expatriate sportspeople in the United States
Expatriate soccer players in the United States
English expatriate footballers